The cingulate sulcus is a sulcus (brain fold) on the cingulate cortex in the medial wall of the cerebral cortex. The frontal and parietal lobes are separated from the cingulate gyrus by the cingulate sulcus. It terminates as the marginal sulcus of the cingulate sulcus. It sends a ramus to separate the paracentral lobule from the frontal gyri, the paracentral sulcus.

Additional images

External links

 
 NIF Search - Cingulate Sulcus via the Neuroscience Information Framework

Sulci (neuroanatomy)
Medial surface of cerebral hemisphere